KGPF is a radio station airing a Spanish Religious format, licensed to Sulphur Springs, Texas, broadcasting on 91.1 MHz FM.

References

External links
KGPF's official website

GPF
GPF